β-Leucine (beta-leucine) is a beta amino acid and positional isomer of -leucine which is naturally produced in humans via the metabolism of -leucine by the enzyme leucine 2,3-aminomutase. In cobalamin (vitamin B12) deficient individuals, plasma concentrations of β-leucine are elevated.

Biosynthesis and metabolism in humans
A small fraction of  metabolism – less than 5% in all tissues except the testes where it accounts for about 33% – is initially catalyzed by leucine aminomutase, producing β-leucine, which is subsequently metabolized into  (β-KIC), β-ketoisocaproyl-CoA, and then acetyl-CoA by a series of uncharacterized enzymes.

References

Amino acids
Non-proteinogenic amino acids